Robert Lee is a city in and the county seat of Coke County, Texas, United States. The population was 1,049 at the 2010 census.

The founders named the city after Robert E. Lee who is thought to have set up camp for a time near the current townsite on the Colorado River. Lee served in Texas from 1856 to 1861 as a lieutenant colonel in the U.S. Army Second Cavalry, during which time he distinguished himself as a scout and engineer.

The town of Robert Lee is located on the Colorado River. Just upstream from the town is E.V. Spence Reservoir, managed by the Colorado River Municipal Water District. From the mid-1960s until approximately 1996, the reservoir's population of striped bass attracted sportsmen from across the southwestern U.S., providing significant income to the town. In the late 1990s, however, water use policies changed and the reservoir water levels were continually lowered until the striped bass population could no longer be sustained.

In addition to a once-great fishery, the area around Robert Lee supports a significant population of white-tailed deer, which can be a nuisance to local ranchers and farmers, but attracts large numbers of hunters during the annual hunting seasons. A very diverse set of wildlife occurs in the area, both native and migratory. Several species of birds, reptiles, and mammals make this part of Texas their home on either a temporary or permanent basis.

Robert Lee and the surrounding area has a rich Native American history. Indian relics and artifacts such as arrowheads, spearpoints, and other tools are commonly found throughout the area.

Geography

Robert Lee is located at  (31.895687, –100.484912).

Demographics

2020 census

As of the 2020 United States census, there were 1,027 people, 540 households, and 297 families residing in the city.

2000 census
As of the census of 2000, 1,171 people, 496 households, and 326 families resided in the city. The population density was 1,026.7 people per square mile (396.6/km). The 658 housing units averaged 576.9/sq mi (222.9/km). The racial makeup of the city was 89.92% White, 0.26% African American, 0.77% Native American, 0.09% Asian, 7.34% from other races, and 1.62% from two or more races. Hispanics or Latinos of any race were 19.64% of the population.

Of 496 households, 27.4% had children under the age of 18 living with them, 52.6% were married couples living together, 11.3% had a female householder with no husband present, and 34.1% were not families. About 32.9% of all households were made up of individuals, and 21.8% had someone living alone who was 65 years of age or older. The average household size was 2.26 and the average family size was 2.85.

In the city, the population was distributed as 22.8% under the age of 18, 5.2% from 18 to 24, 21.1% from 25 to 44, 22.3% from 45 to 64, and 28.6% who were 65 years of age or older. The median age was 46 years. For every 100 females, there were 81.8 males. For every 100 females age 18 and over, there were 79.4 males.

The median income for a household in the city was $25,750, and for a family was $33,553. Males had a median income of $30,486 versus $19,615 for females. The per capita income for the city was $16,672. About 12.0% of families and 14.8% of the population were below the poverty line, including 16.6% of those under age 18 and 14.5% of those age 65 or over.

Education
The city is served by the Robert Lee Independent School District and is home to the Robert Lee High School Steers.

Notable people

 Winnie Baze, American football player
 John Burroughs, Democratic governor of New Mexico, 1959–1960
 Wallace Clift (1926–2018), professor and author
 Dean E. Hallmark, born in Robert Lee on January 20, 1914, served as the command pilot of B-25 #6, the Green Hornet, on Jimmy Doolittle's Tokyo raid of April 18, 1942. He was captured by Japanese forces and executed on October 15, 1942. His remains were located after the war and interred at Arlington National Cemetery.

References

External links
History – From "The Handbook of Texas Online"
Unofficial city website
Robert Lee Independent School District
E.V. Spence Reservoir

Cities in Coke County, Texas
Cities in Texas
County seats in Texas